Tesárske Mlyňany is a village and municipality in Zlaté Moravce District of the Nitra Region, in western-central Slovakia.

History
The town was originally formed by association of two previously separate villages,  Tesáre nad Žitavou and Mlynany.  Tesárske means Carpenter and so its name means Carpenter over the Zittau River and is among the oldest settlements in the region, first recorded as a settlement of Tazzari in 1075AD although Archaeological findings show settlement since the 9th century. Mlynany is first recorded as Malonian in 1209AD.  Both names come from craft focus of its inhabitants.

Geography
The village lies in the Zittau upland, on both banks of the Zittau river, about 4 km south of the town of Zlaté Moravce. Nitra is the nearest large town. The  village is accessed by the R1 expressway and I/65 road, leading north-south.  The population is  1787  and  has  an area of 18km² The municipality lies at an altitude of 170 metres and covers an area of 18.007 km². In 2011 it had a population of 1683 inhabitants.

Sister Cities
 Zborovice - Czech Republic 
 Kétsoprony - Hungary

Culture and attractions
 Arboretum Mlyňany Slovak Academy of Sciences 
 Roman Catholic Church of the Annunciation from 1763. 
 Chapel of the Exaltation.  Crisis of 1841. 
 Granary - church Aniel

References

External links
Official homepage

Villages and municipalities in Zlaté Moravce District